Arka Gdynia is a Polish professional basketball team, based in Gdynia. The team plays in the Polish PLK. The club's sponsorship name comes from the company Asseco. Historically the team is one of the most successful in Poland, mainly because of the nine championships in a row the team won from 2004 to 2012.

History
The team was founded in 1995, as STK Trefl Sopot. In its first season, the team won the Polish third division and promotion to the Polish second division. In the 1996–97 season, after winning Group B of the Polish second division, the team was promoted to the top Polish Basketball League, the Dominet Bank Ekstraliga.

In 2003, Prokom Trefl played in the final of the FIBA EuroCup Challenge, against Aris. Starting in 2004, the team began to play in the EuroLeague. In its first EuroLeague season, the club became the first Polish team to reach the EuroLeague's Top 16 stage. Through the 2012–13 season, it was one of 14 clubs across Europe that held Euroleague Basketball A Licenses, which (normally) gave their holders an automatic place in the Regular Season phase of the EuroLeague.

In 2018, the club changed its name to Arka Gdynia. It also made a return to European-wide competitions for the first time in 6 years, by playing in the 2018–19 EuroCup.

Arena
Since 2009, Arka Gdynia has played its home games at the 5,500 seat Gdynia Sports Arena.

Honours and titles
Polish Championships (9):
2004, 2005, 2006, 2007, 2008, 2009, 2010, 2011, 2012
Polish Cups (4):
2000, 2001, 2006, 2008 
Polish SuperCups (2): 
2001, 2010

Season by season

 Cancelled due to the COVID-19 pandemic in Europe.

Players

Current roster

Notable players

Head coaches

References

External links
 Official website (in Polish)
 Eurobasket.com Team Page

Arka Gdynia
Basketball teams in Poland
Basketball teams established in 1995
Sport in Gdynia